Irish drinking song may refer to: 

 "Irish Drinking Song", a song by the ska band Buck-O-Nine from the album Songs in the Key of Bree.
 Note that this song is commonly misattributed to Flogging Molly, Dropkick Murphys, or The Bouncing Souls, and may additionally be mistitled as "Drink and Fight".
 "The Irish Drinking Song", a song by Australian band Man Bites God.
 "Another Irish Drinking Song", a humorous song by a cappella group Da Vinci's Notebook.
 Irish drinking songs, a game structure used in improvisational comedy where lyrics are improvised upon traditional Irish chords.
 Irish drinking songs, a genre of traditional Irish songs (for example, Seven Drunken Nights).